Nemanja Bilbija (born 2 November 1990) is a Bosnian professional footballer who plays as a forward for Bosnian Premier League club Zrinjski Mostar and the Bosnia and Herzegovina national team.

A former youth international for Bosnia and Herzegovina, Bilbija made his senior international debut in 2018. He is the Bosnian Premier League's record goalscorer.

Club career

Early career
Bilbija started his career with his hometown club Borac Banja Luka, whose academy he joined in 2000. He made his professional debut on 8 November 2008 against Posušje at the age of 18. He scored his first goal as a professional against Orašje on 7 March 2009.

On 29 January 2010 Bilbija moved to Serbian side Vojvodina signing a four-year contract. During his time at the club, he was sent on two loans to his former club, Borac Banja Luka.

In August 2013, Bilbija signed a two-year deal with Sarajevo.

In July 2015, he joined Split on a two-year contract.

Zrinjski Mostar
On 11 February 2016, Bilbija signed with Zrinjski Mostar on free transfer. He scored on his competitive debut for the club against his former team Sarajevo on 28 February.

In August 2017, Bilbija signed a new two-year deal with Zrinjski Mostar. In a game against Vitez on 26 August, Bilbija scored his first hat-trick for the team. A year later, he scored four goals in a convincing triumph over Zvijezda 09.

On 10 November 2018, Bilbija scored a brace on his 100th appearance for the club.

Gangwon
On 23 December 2018, Bilbija joined South Korean side Gangwon for an undisclosed transfer fee. On 4 January 2019, Bilbija officially joined Gangwon after signing a contract with the club.

He made his debut for Gangwon on 2 March 2019, in a 2–0 away loss against Sangju Sangmu coming in as a substitute in the 71st minute.

Bilbija scored his first goal for Gangwon on 15 May 2019, in a 2–0 home win against Paju Citizen in the round of 16 of the 2019 Korean FA Cup.

Return to Zrinjski Mostar
On 24 December 2019, Bilbija came back to Zrinjski almost a year after joining Gangwon, signing a three and a half year contract which will last until the summer of 2023 with the Mostar based club. In his first game back, Bilbija scored a goal in a 2–0 league win against Čelik Zenica on 23 February 2020.

On 31 October 2020, he scored a hat-trick against Velež in the Mostar derby.

Bilbija finished the 2020–21 season as the league's top goalscorer with 17 goals.

In a league game against Sarajevo on 23 October 2021, Bilbija scored his 76th goal for Zrinjski, making him the club's highest goalscorer of all time. Following a 4–0 over Sarajevo on 16 April 2022, the club was crowned league champions, with Bilbija winning his fourth league title with Zrinjski. He finished the 2021–22 season again as the league's top goalscorer with a record-breaking 33 goals.

On 4 September 2022, Bilbija scored two goals in a 4–1 league win against Sarajevo, overtaking Wagner as the Bosnian Premier League's record goalscorer.

International career
Bilbija was a member of the Bosnia and Herzegovina national under-21 team. He was also captain of the under-21 side and is the highest goalscorer in the team's history with 9 goals.

In August 2017, Bilbija received his first senior call-up, for 2018 FIFA World Cup qualifiers against Cyprus and Gibraltar. He debuted in a friendly game against United States on 28 January 2018.

Personal life
Bilbija's father Milorad was also a professional footballer who currently works as a football manager.

Career statistics

Club

International

Honours
Sarajevo
Bosnian Premier League: 2014–15
Bosnian Cup: 2013–14

Zrinjski Mostar
Bosnian Premier League: 2015–16, 2016–17, 2017–18, 2021–22

Individual
Bosnian Premier League Top Goalscorer: 2020–21 (17 goals), 2021–22 (33 goals)

References

External links

1990 births
Living people
Sportspeople from Banja Luka
Serbs of Bosnia and Herzegovina
Bosnia and Herzegovina footballers
Bosnia and Herzegovina youth international footballers
Bosnia and Herzegovina under-21 international footballers
Bosnia and Herzegovina international footballers
Bosnia and Herzegovina expatriate footballers
Association football forwards
FK Borac Banja Luka players
FK Vojvodina players
FK Sarajevo players
RNK Split players
HŠK Zrinjski Mostar players
Gangwon FC players
Premier League of Bosnia and Herzegovina players
Serbian SuperLiga players
Croatian Football League players
K League 1 players
Expatriate footballers in Serbia
Expatriate footballers in Croatia
Expatriate footballers in South Korea
Bosnia and Herzegovina expatriate sportspeople in Serbia
Bosnia and Herzegovina expatriate sportspeople in Croatia
Bosnia and Herzegovina expatriate sportspeople in South Korea